Andrius Pojavis (born 25 November 1983) is a Lithuanian singer-songwriter. On 20 December 2012, he was selected to represent Lithuania at the Eurovision Song Contest 2013, which was held in Malmö, Sweden on 18 May 2013.

Early career 
Pojavis began singing at a young age, and during high school he played in a band called "No Hero". After graduating from high school, Pojavis moved to Vilnius where he graduated History studies at Lithuanian University of Educational Sciences and played in a number of bands, including the "Hetero", who won the "EuroRock" competition in 2006. He later moved to Ireland, where he lived for one year, and began to write solo material. In 2012, Pojavis began to record his debut album in Massive Arts studio in Milan, Italy. The first single "Traukiniai" was later that year, ranking within the top twenty of the Lithuanian Singles Chart, and its music video was aired on national television. Following this success, Pojavis released his debut album "Aštuoni" to both commercial and critical acclaim in Lithuania.

Eurovision
Andrius represented Lithuania at the Eurovision Song Contest 2013 with the song "Something." He collected 53 points in the first semi final, held on May 14, and placed ninth. In the final, he came twenty-second with 17 points. During a press conference held following the first semi final, Pojavis stated he would like to place eighth, a reference to his album,  titled Astuoni.

Personal life
Pojavis is currently living in Valencia, Spain with his wife and two daughters.

References

Eurovision Song Contest entrants for Lithuania
21st-century Lithuanian male singers
Lithuanian pop singers
Eurovision Song Contest entrants of 2013
People from Jurbarkas
Living people
1983 births
English-language singers from Lithuania
Lithuanian emigrants to Italy
Lithuanian University of Educational Sciences alumni